This article concerns appeals against decisions of the Crown Court of England and Wales. The majority of appeals against Crown Court decisions are heard by the Criminal Division of the Court of Appeal.

Jurisdiction of the Court of Appeal and Divisional Court
The Court of Appeal has jurisdiction to hear the following appeals:

The Divisional Court of the Queen's Bench Division of the High Court has jurisdiction to hear appeals by way of case stated and applications for judicial review, where the Crown Court is conducting an appeal against a decision of a magistrates' court.

Appeals to the Court of Appeal

Composition of the Court

References

Bibliography

English criminal law